Alaviq may refer to:
 Alaviq, Kaleybar
 Alaviq, Varzaqan